Nelly Maas (born 1935, The Hague) is a former Dutch figure skater.

Results

References, external links

results

1935 births
Living people
Dutch female single skaters
Sportspeople from The Hague
20th-century Dutch women
21st-century Dutch women